A whale louse is a commensal crustacean of the family Cyamidae. Despite the name, it is not a true louse (which are insects), but rather is related to the skeleton shrimp, most species of which are found in shallower waters. Whale lice are external parasites, found in skin lesions, genital folds, nostrils and eyes of marine mammals of the order Cetacea. These include not only whales but also dolphins and porpoises.

Appearance
The body of a whale louse is distinctly flat and considerably reduced at the rear. Its legs, especially the back three pairs of legs, have developed into claw-like protuberances with which it clings to its host. Its length ranges from  depending on the species.

Life cycle
Most species of whale louse are associated with a single species of whale. They remain with their host throughout their development and do not experience a free-swimming phase.  Although the relationship between a specific species of whale louse and a specific species of whale is more pronounced with baleen whales than with toothed whales, almost every species of whale has a louse species that is unique to it. With the sperm whale, the parasitic relationship is sex-specific. The whale louse Cyamus catodontis lives exclusively on the skin of the male, while Neocyamus physeteris is found only on females and calves.

Whale lice attach themselves to the host body in places that protect them from water currents, so they can be found in natural body openings and in wounds; with baleen whales they are found primarily on the head and in the ventral pleats. Around 7,500 whale lice live on a single whale.

With some species of whale louse, whale barnacle infestations play an important role. On the right whale, the parasites live mainly on callosities (raised callus-like patches of skin on the whales' heads). The clusters of white lice contrast with the dark skin of the whale, and help researchers identify individual whales because of the lice clusters' unique shapes.

The lice predominantly eat algae that settle on the host's body. They usually feed off the flaking skin of the host and frequent wounds or open areas. They cause minor skin damage, but this does not lead to significant illness.

The development of the whale louse is closely connected with the life pattern of whales. The distribution of various louse species reflects migratory patterns.

Species
Currently, 31 species are recognised:

Cyamus Latreille, 1796
Cyamus antarcticensis Vlasova, 1982
Cyamus bahamondei Buzeta, 1963
Cyamus balaenopterae K. H. Barnard, 1931
Cyamus boopis Lütken, 1870
Cyamus catodontis Margolis, 1954
Cyamus ceti (Linnaeus, 1758)
Cyamus erraticus Roussel de Vauzème, 1834
Cyamus eschrichtii Margolis, McDonald & Bousfield, 2000
Cyamus gracilis Roussel de Vauzème, 1834
Cyamus kessleri A. Brandt, 1873
Cyamus mesorubraedon Margolis, McDonald & Bousfield, 2000
Cyamus monodontis Lutken, 1870
Cyamus nodosus Lutken, 1861
Cyamus orcini Leung, 1970
Cyamus orubraedon Waller, 1989
Cyamus ovalis Roussel de Vauzème, 1834
Cyamus rhytinae (J. F. Brandt, 1846)
Cyamus scammoni Dall, 1872
Isocyamus Gervais & van Beneden, 1859
Isocyamus antarcticensis Vlasova in Berzin & Vlasova, 1982
Isocyamus delphinii Guérin Méneville, 1836
Isocyamus deltabrachium Sedlak-Weinstein, 1992
Isocyamus kogiae Sedlak-Weinstein, 1992
Neocyamus Margolis, 1955
Neocyamus physeteris (Pouchet, 1888)
Platycyamus Lütken, 1870
Platycyamus flaviscutatus Waller, 1989
Platycyamus thompsoni (Gosse, 1855)
Scutocyamus Lincoln & Hurley, 1974
Scutocyamus antipodensis Lincoln & Hurley, 1980
Scutocyamus parvus Lincoln & Hurley, 1974
Syncyamus Bowman, 1955
Syncyamus aequus Lincoln & Hurley, 1981
Syncyamus chelipes (Costa, 1866)
Syncyamus ilheusensis Haney, De Almeida & Reid, 2004
Syncyamus pseudorcae Bowman, 1955

References 
 Much of the content of this article comes from the equivalent German-language Wikipedia article (September 2005).

Corophiidea
Parasitic crustaceans
Taxa named by Constantine Samuel Rafinesque